In enzymology, a peptide-O-fucosyltransferase is an enzyme that catalyzes the chemical reaction in which an alpha-L-fucosylpyranoside residue is transferred from GDP-beta-L-fucose to the sidechain oxygen atom of a serine or threonine residue in a protein.

This enzyme belongs to the family of glycosyltransferases, specifically the hexosyltransferases.  The systematic name of this enzyme class is GDP-beta-L-fucose:polypeptide O-alpha-L-fucosyltransferase. Other names in common use include GDP-L-fucose:polypeptide fucosyltransferase, GDP-fucose protein O-fucosyltransferase, and GDP-fucose:polypeptide fucosyltransferase.

References

 
 
 
 

EC 2.4.1
Enzymes of unknown structure